Enicmus histrio is a species of beetle belonging to the family Latridiidae.

It is native to Europe.

References

Latridiidae